During the Vashon Glaciation a series of lakes formed along the southern margin of the Cordilleran Ice Cap. In the Puget Sound depression, a series of lakes developed, of which Lake Russell was the largest and the longest lasting. When the ice margin receded northward, the lake expanded. The new longer and lower level lake is referred to as Lake Hood. The glacier continued to retreat until the northern outlet of the Hood Canal was reached as the water level equalized with Glacial Lake Russell becoming part of that body of water.

Lake Russell is named for geologist, Israel Cook Russell.

Forming about 17,000 years before present (ybp) as the ice front began to retreat northward. One version or another of Lake Russell existed form 16,900 ybp until 15,900 ybp.

Early Lake Russell
Early Lake Russell formed in the southern basins of Puget Sound. As the glacial ice retreated northward, the geologic troughs, which create the basins of the sound remained blocked from the northward outlets, until the Tacoma Narrows cleared, the basins east of Tacoma remained separate from those to the west. Lake Tacoma is the name given to these eastern waters, until they merged with those of Lake Russell to the west. Lake Nisqually was the name given to the freshwater in the Nisqually Reach, until the ice front retreated far enough north for the meltwaters to cover the land between the mouth of the Nisqually River and Olympia, joining a freshwater lake in the Budd Inlet and Black Lake forming Early Lake Russell.

Black Lake Outlet
When the glacial ice receded northward, reaching the Olympia area, a low drainage was reached in the eastern Black Hills. Using the Black River as its primary drainage, Lake Russell came into existence was continued after the edge of the ice had withdrawn from the region. Using two channels, the waters drained south to the Chehalis River valley. A northern channel left the Budd Inlet in near Butler Cove. A southern channel passed through Capitol Lake. A third channel may have existed from the Eld Inlet. They merged where Black Lake now exists, following the Black River southward. This barrier is thought to be deposits from the outflow.
Percival Creek contains the Northern Pacific Railroad route over the pass between Puget Sound and the Chehalis Valley. In the pass is a long, narrow swamp, which drains to both Puget Sound and Grays Harbor. The existing valley is the result of post-glacial erosion. The bluffs along both sides are seen as evidence of this theory.
Black Lake resides in the pass, beginning as a swamp.
Withdrawal of the edge of the ice from Thurston County left both the Deschutes and Nisqually Rivers free to flow directly northward to the growing body of water in the unobliterated interglacial valleys. The Nisqually carried a large volume of water when it first entered Lake Russell, since the Ohop channel still contributed the drainage of the northern and western slopes of Mount Rainier. It appears to have entered the western side of the interglacial Gate Pathway River valley, and to have contributed considerably toward the obliteration of that valley by deposition of the Sherlock Delta.

References

Russell
Russell
Pierce County, Washington
King County, Washington
Thurston County, Washington
Geography of Washington (state)
Proglacial lakes